Lincoln Township is a township in Grant County, Kansas, USA.  As of the 2000 census, its population was 7,058.

Geography
According to the USGS, it contains one cemetery, Ulysses.

Transportation
Lincoln Township contains one airport or landing strip, Ulysses Airport.

References
 USGS Geographic Names Information System (GNIS)

External links
 US-Counties.com
 City-Data.com

Townships in Grant County, Kansas
Townships in Kansas